Justicia riparia (syn. Beloperone mollis Nees) is a plant native to the Cerrado vegetation of Brazil.

See also
 List of plants of Cerrado vegetation of Brazil

riparia
Flora of Brazil